Sheldon Gershon "Shelly" Yakus (born November 1945) is an American music engineer and mixer. Formerly chief engineer and vice president of A&M Records, he was nominated for induction into the Rock and Roll Hall of Fame in 1999. Yakus is referenced at the end of one of Tom Petty's songs "What're You Doin' In My Life?"  As of 2014, Yakus was chief engineer of AfterMaster Audio Labs and Recording Studios, a recording firm he co-founded with Larry Ryckman, who is its CEO. Yakus is also vice president of Studio One Media, Inc.

Biography
Yakus has engineered recordings for many performers, including John Lennon, the Ramones, U2, Tom Petty and the Heartbreakers, Van Morrison, Alice Cooper, the Band, Blue Öyster Cult, Dire Straits, Amy Grant, Don Henley, Madonna, Stevie Nicks, The Pointer Sisters, Raspberries, Lou Reed, Bob Seger, Patti Smith, Suzanne Vega, Warren Zevon, Cutting Crew, Star Radio, Elliott Murphy and Joan Armatrading. He acted as assistant engineer (1967–1969) for recordings by Dionne Warwick, Peter, Paul & Mary, Frankie Valli & The Four Seasons, Count Basie & His Orchestra, and Frank Sinatra.

Family 
Yakus is the son of songwriter Milton Yakus, known for composing "Old Cape Cod".  Milton, with his brother, Herbert, owned Ace Recording Studios in Boston where Shelly worked in the 1960s before moving on to A & R Recording in New York.

References

External links
www.shellyyakus.info

American audio engineers
Living people
1945 births